Ahmadabad (also Romanized as Aḩmadābād; also known as Aḩmadābād-e Mollā Mās, Sanqar Sāqī, and Sungar Sāqi) is a village in Sar Firuzabad Rural District, Firuzabad District, Kermanshah County, Kermanshah Province, Iran. At the 2006 census, its population was 119, in 26 families.

References 

Populated places in Kermanshah County